Khok Kwang is a sub-district (tambon) in Bung Khla District, in Bueng Kan Province, northeastern Thailand. As of 2010, it had a population of 4,596 people and jurisdiction over nine villages.

References

Tambon of Bueng Kan province
Populated places in Bueng Kan province
Bung Khla District